The impetus is a ballroom dance step used in the waltz, foxtrot or quickstep.  The open impetus is one of several ways to get into promenade position and is used to turn dancers around corners or change their direction on the dance floor. It is often performed after a natural turn.

The open impetus has less turn than the closed impetus.  The closed impetus remains in closed position, while the open impetus ends in an open promenade position. Both have a heel turn for the man, that is, he turns on his left heel on the second beat.

Closed impetus
Leader (man)

Follower (lady)

Open impetus

The open impetus is a Silver syllabus variation on the closed impetus.

Leader (man)

Begin in closed position, backing line of dance.

Follower (lady)

Begin in closed position, facing line of dance.

References

External links
 Victor Veyrasset and Heather Smith demonstrating the open impetus

Waltz dance moves